Southern Star Central Gas Pipeline, Inc, headquartered in Owensboro, Kentucky, is a natural gas transmission system spanning approximately  in the Midwest and Mid-continent regions of the United States. Southern Star's employees and its pipeline system and facilities are located throughout Kansas, Oklahoma, Missouri, Wyoming, Colorado, Texas, Nebraska, and Kentucky. It serves major markets such as St. Louis, Wichita, and Kansas City. Southern Star is a locally managed, private company owned by Caisse de dépôt et placement du Québec and Ullico, Inc. The company is more commonly referred to as Southern Star. The company's FERC code is 43.

History
The company was formed in 1904. In 1926, it was renamed Cities Service Gas Company. It was again renamed in 1982 to the Northwest Central Pipeline Corporation. Five years later it took the name Williams Natural Gas Company. In 1997, it was reorganized and called the Williams Gas Pipeline Central, Inc. In 2003, it was renamed the Southern Star Central Gas Pipeline, Inc.

Pipeline statistics 
Seasonal Storage 
Annual Throughput 
Supply Areas Midcontinent, Rockies
Market Areas Kansas, Oklahoma, Nebraska, Missouri, Wyoming, Colorado, Texas
Miles of Pipeline Approx 5,800
Compressor Stations 42
Horsepower 209,914
Gas Storage Fields 8
Pipeline Connections 31 (10 Delivery, 16 Receipt, 5 Bi-directional)

Central Pipeline 
Southern Star's Central Pipeline brings gas from the Rocky Mountains, Texas, and Oklahoma to Kansas. From there it goes east to Missouri.

External links
Southern Star Central Gas Pipeline Website
Pipeline Electronic Bulletin Board

Natural gas pipelines in the United States
Natural gas companies of the United States
Natural gas pipeline companies
Natural gas pipelines in Kansas
Natural gas pipelines in Oklahoma
Natural gas pipelines in Missouri
Natural gas pipelines in Wyoming
Natural gas pipelines in Colorado
Natural gas pipelines in Texas
Natural gas pipelines in Nebraska
Natural gas pipelines in Kentucky